Zuhrah ibn Kilab ibn Murrah was the great-grandfather of Aminah bint Wahb, and was thus the great-great-grandfather of the Islamic prophet Muhammad. He was also the progenitor of the Banu Zuhrah clan of the Quraysh tribe in Mecca.

Biography
According to traditional Islamic belief, Zuhrah's father was Kilab ibn Murrah, a descendant of Ibrahim (Abraham) through his son Ismail (Ishmael). His younger brother Qusai ibn Kilab became the first Quraysh custodian of the Ka'bah. After his father's death his mother Fatimah bint Sa'd married Rabi'ah ibn Haram from the Bani Azra tribe.

His younger brother, Qusai ibn Kilab, became the first Quraysh custodian of the Ka'aba and brought those of Quraysh who were his nearest of kin and settled them in the Meccan valley besides the Sanctuary. Which included him, his uncle Taym ibn Murrah, the son of another uncle Makhzum ibn Yaqazah, and his other cousins Jumah and Sahm who were less close.

During the apparent quarrels of his nephews 'Abd Manaf and 'Abd ad-Dar, after Qusai had invested 'Abd ad-Dar with all his rights, powers, and transferred the ownership of the House of Assembly shortly before his death, Zuhrah supported 'Abd Manaf in contesting 'Abd ad-Dar's inheritance.

Family tree

 * indicates that the marriage order is disputed
 Note that direct lineage is marked in bold.

See also
Family tree of Muhammad

References

Year of death unknown
Year of birth unknown
Ancient Arabs
Ancestors of Muhammad
Sahabah ancestors
5th-century Arabs